Glibert Leung Kam-ho (born 23 July 1953, Macau) was a member of the Legislative Council of Hong Kong (1991–93) for the Regional Council constituency, Regional Council of Hong Kong and Sai Kung District Board.

He was found guilty in 1993 for trying to bribe two regional councillors to vote for him in the 1991 Legislative Council election and removed from the seat. He was subsequently jailed for three years.

References

1953 births
Living people
Members of the Regional Council of Hong Kong
District councillors of Sai Kung District
Hong Kong criminals
Alumni of the Chinese University of Hong Kong
HK LegCo Members 1991–1995
Hong Kong politicians convicted of crimes